Quhramaana Kakar is an important Afghan female peacemaker. In 2012 she won the N-Peace Award.

Biography
Kakar became an Afghan refugee to Pakistan after the events in 2001. This led her to become active in the peace building process and specifically to work to include women in the process.  From 2010 to 2012 Kakar served as gender adviser to the Afghanistan Peace and Reintegration Program (APRP). Her education includes an MPhil from the University of Cambridge. She is the founder of the non-governmental organization Women for Peace and Participation based in London and Kabul. In 2012 Azimi was awarded the N-Peace Award as a Role Model  for Peace. She was a visiting fellow at the London School of Economics' Centre for Women, Peace and Security.

Kakar has written several opinion pieces for various publications including openDemocracy, Thomson Reuters Foundation News, and The Washington Post.  She is a Senior Strategic Advisor for Conciliation Resources.

References

External links
 Quhramaana Kakar wins the N-Peace Award 2012: Afghanistan YouTube video

Living people
Date of birth missing (living people)
21st-century Afghan women
Afghan women activists
Year of birth missing (living people)